The 2020–21 CSA Steaua București season is the team's 59th season since its founding in 1947.

Players

First team squad

Transfers

In

Source:

Out

Source:

Pre-season and friendlies

Competitions

Overview

Liga III - Seria IV

Standings

Matches

Liga III promotion play-off

Cupa României

Statistics

Squad appearances and goals
Last updated on 7 June 2021.

|-
! colspan="12" style="background:#dcdcdc; text-align:center"|Goalkeepers

|-
! colspan="12" style="background:#dcdcdc; text-align:center"|Defenders

|-
! colspan="12" style="background:#dcdcdc; text-align:center"|Midfielders

|-
! colspan="12" style="background:#dcdcdc; text-align:center"|Forwards

|-
|}

References

CSA Steaua București seasons
Steaua